The women's senior fours is one of the events at the annual Bowls England National Championships. The event was inaugurated in 2017.

Past winners

References

Bowls in England